Ashley Municipal Airport  is a public use airport located one nautical mile (2 km) southeast of the central business district of Ashley, a city in McIntosh County, North Dakota, United States. It is owned by the Ashley Municipal Airport Authority.

Facilities and aircraft 
Ashley Municipal Airport covers an area of 90 acres (36 ha) at an elevation of 2,032 feet (619 m) above mean sea level. It has two runways: 14/32 is 4,300 by 60 feet (1,311 x 18 m) with an asphalt surface and 8/26 is 2,825 by 150 feet (861 x 46 m) with a turf surface.

For the 12-month period ending July 15, 2011, the airport had 2,610 aircraft operations, an average of 217 per month: 92% general aviation, 8% air taxi, and <1% military. At that time there were 11 aircraft based at this airport, all single-engine.

References

External links 
 Ashley Municipal Airport (ASY) at North Dakota Aeronautics Commission
 Aerial image as of October 1997 from USGS The National Map
 

Airports in North Dakota
Buildings and structures in McIntosh County, North Dakota
Transportation in McIntosh County, North Dakota